R. Viswanathan, also known as Rengaraj Viswanathan, is a retired Indian diplomat, writer and speaker specializing in Latin American politics, markets, and culture.

Diplomatic posts 
R. Viswanathan has held various positions in Lisbon, Karachi, Port Louis, Tripoli, and New York City. He was the first Indian Consul General in Sao Paulo, Brazil from 1996 to 2000. From 2000 to 2003 he was the Indian Ambassador to Venezuela and from September 2003 to  September 2007 he was stationed at the Ministry of External Affairs in New Delhi, looking after the Latin America Division. From October 2007 to May 2012 he was the Indian Ambassador to Argentina, Uruguay, and Paraguay, based out of Buenos Aires.

Writing and speaking 
For the last 18 years R. Viswanathan has been specializing in Latin America, writing articles and giving lectures on Latin American politics, markets, and culture.

Speaking 
Viswanathan gives speeches in both Spanish and Portuguese and has visited almost all of the countries in the Latin American region. Records exist of more than 100 speeches since June 2004. More than thirty of these speeches are preserved on the internet.

Writing 
He has published documents on the Latin American region, including:
 Guide for Business with Brazil - January 1997
 A Market Study of Mercosur - June 1997
 Business with Venezuela - January 2001
 Business with Andean Community - April 2001
 Business with Latin America, 2nd edition - Feb 2005
 Business with Argentina, Uruguay and Paraguay, 2nd edition - January 2010
 Malgudi to Macondo - the journey of an innocent Indian through the seductive Latin America - August 2012 - published by Indo-Latin American Chamber

References 

1952 births
Living people
Ambassadors of India to Venezuela
Ambassadors of India to Argentina
Ambassadors of India to Uruguay
Ambassadors of India to Paraguay